Muṭim ibn Adi was a non-Muslim contemporary of the Islamic prophet Muhammad and the chief of the Banu Nawfal clan of the Banu Quraish tribe.

Biography

Family
His father was 'Adi, son of Nawfal ibn Abd Manaf.

Muṭim died a non-Muslim; however, his son Jubayr ibn Mut'im became a Muslim.

Muhammad's era

Third deputation with Abu Talib

Muṭim was part of the third deputation aimed at having Abu Talib stop protecting Muhammad.

Meccan banishment of the Hashemites (617-619)

Muṭim, together with four other people, took a prominent initiative that resulted in the end of the Meccan banishment that was causing starvation to the Muslims.

Aisha (ca. 615-620)

Abu Bakr had initially engaged his daughter Aisha to Muṭim's son Jubayr ibn Muṭim some time between her birth in 613 and 619. When Muṭim was informed that Abu Bakr had adopted Islam, he no longer wished his son to marry ‘A’isha, who later married Muhammed.

Muhammad's visit to Ta'if (620)

When Muhammad and Zayd ibn Harithah (son of Haritha, who was for a time the adopted son of Muhammad) went to Ta'if to invite them to Islam, but did not succeed and returned to Mecca, he did not  return openly. Muhammad sent Zaid to seek asylum for him among his friends in Mecca. Mut‘im provided asylum for him and he returned to Mecca.

Isra and Miraj (620)

After Muhammad stated that he had undergone the Isra and Miraj, Muṭim  said:

Abu Bakr said:

Second pledge at al-Aqabah (622)

Sad ibn Ubadah participated in the secret Second pledged. It was not after that the Medinan pilgrims had left the city that the Meccans became aware of meeting and in a fit of rage, they pursued the pilgrims but only managed to catch hold of Sad, who they subjected to great tortures, but he was later rescued by Muṭim and Harith ibn Harb with whom Sad had trade relations.

References

People from Mecca
623 deaths
Opponents of Muhammad
7th-century Arabs
Blind people